The Night My Mother Killed My Father is a 2016 Spanish comedy film directed by .

Cast

See also 
 List of Spanish films of 2016

References

External links 

2016 comedy films
Spanish black comedy films
Spanish comedy films
2010s Spanish-language films
2010s Spanish films